Dastjerd (also known as Dasht Gird and Dasht Kord) is a village in Khorrami Rural District, in the Central District of Khorrambid County, Fars Province, Iran. At the 2006 census, its population was 18, in 7 families.

References 

Populated places in Khorrambid County